The following are the appointments to various Canadian Honours of 2010. Usually, they are announced as part of the New Year and Canada Day celebrations and are published within the Canada Gazette during year. This follows the custom set out within the United Kingdom which publishes its appoints of various British Honours for New Year's and for monarch's official birthday. However, instead of the midyear appointments announced on Victoria Day, the official birthday of the Canadian Monarch, this custom has been transferred with the celebration of Canadian Confederation and the creation of the Order of Canada.

However, as the Canada Gazette publishes appointment to various orders, decorations and medal, either Canadian or from Commonwealth and foreign states, this article will reference all Canadians so honoured during the 2010 calendar year.

Provincial Honours are not listed within the Canada Gazette, however they are listed within the various publications of each provincial government.

The Order of Canada

Companions of the Order of Canada

 Willard S. Boyle, C.C. Willard S. Boyle, C.C.
 Joseph A. Rouleau, C.C., G.O.Q. - This is a promotion within the Order
 The Honourable Michael H. Wilson, P.C., C.C. - This is a promotion within the Order

Officer of the Order of Canada

 Michael James Audain, O.C., O.B.C. 
 Clark Blaise, O.C. 
 Pierre Boivin, O.C. 
 Paul Buissonneau, O.C. 
 Mel Cappe, O.C. 
 Burton Cummings, O.C., O.M. 
 Clémence DesRochers, O.C., C.Q.
 The Honourable Gary Filmon, P.C., O.C., O.M. 
 The Honourable John Frederick Hamm, O.C. 
 Peter Hinton, O.C. 
 Yves Jacques, O.C. 
 The Honourable Philippe Kirsch, O.C. 
 Shrawan Kumar, O.C. 
 Mario Lemieux, O.C., C.Q. 
 Jonathan Lomas, O.C. 
 Alexa Ann McDonough, O.C. 
 Pierre Nadeau, O.C., C.Q. 
 James Orbinski, O.C., O.Ont., M.S.C. 
 Gordon W. Perkin, O.C. 
 Bruce Phillips, O.C. 
 Guylène Proulx, O.C. 
 Ivan Reitman, O.C. 
 Carol Lillian Richards, O.C.
 Carol Stephenson, O.C. 
 Neil Young, O.C., O.M.
 The Honourable David A. Anderson, P.C., O.C. 
 Raymonde April, O.C. 
 Richard B. Baltzan, O.C. 
 Raymond Chrétien, O.C. 
 Claudio Cuello, O.C. 
 Hélène Dorion, O.C., C.Q.
 Gwynne Dyer, O.C. 
 The Honourable Jake Epp, P.C., O.C. 
 Michael J. Fox, O.C. 
 John Furlong, O.C. 
 R. Brian Haynes, O.C. 
 Margaret Lock, O.C., O.Q. 
 John Mighton, O.C. 
 Earl Muldon, O.C. 
 Julie Payette, O.C., C.Q. 
 Alvin C. Segal, O.C. - This is a promotion within the Order
 Nahum Sonenberg, O.C. 
 Mladen Vranic, O.C.

Members of the Order of Canada

 Murray Angus, C.M. 
 The Honourable Jean Augustine, P.C., C.M. 
 Elsie Basque, C.M. 
 Émile Bouchard, C.M., C.Q. 
 Tantoo Cardinal, C.M. 
 Joan Florence Clark, C.M. 
 Renée Claude, C.M. 
 Calixte Duguay, C.M. 
 Janet C. Gardiner, C.M. 
 Judy Gingell, C.M.
 Joan Glode, C.M. 
 John Charles Godel, C.M. 
 S. Larry Goldenberg, C.M., O.B.C. 
 Bernard Sydney Goldman, C.M. 
 Patrick J. Gullane, C.M. 
 Dan S. Hanganu, C.M., O.Q.
 Jean-Claude Labrecque, C.M., C.Q. 
 Louise Lévesque, C.M., C.Q. 
 Jeffrey C. Lozon, C.M. 
 Margaret Lyons, C.M. 
 Patricia Parr, C.M. 
 David Kent Pecaut, C.M. 
 David Adams Richards, C.M., O.N.B. 
 Bruce Sanford, C.M. 
 Roméo Savoie, C.M. 
 Joseph A. Sealy, C.M. 
 Robert W. Slater, C.M. 
 Raoul Sosa, C.M. 
 John Stanton, C.M. 
 Wayne Strongman, C.M. 
 Réjean Thomas, C.M., C.Q. 
 Ian Andrew Vorres, C.M. 
 Bob White, C.M.
 Georges A. Arès, C.M. 
 The Honourable Lise Bacon, C.M., G.O.Q. 
 Herbert C. Belcourt, C.M. 
 Michel G. Bergeron, C.M., O.Q. 
 Sandra Birdsell, C.M. 
 Alice Chan-Yip, C.M. 
 W. Edmund Clark, C.M. 
 Stephen Clarkson, C.M. 
 Phil Comeau, C.M. 
 Adriana A. Davies, C.M. 
 Abraham (Braam) de Klerk, C.M. 
 Marq de Villiers, C.M. 
 René Derouin, C.M., C.Q. 
 Marlys A. Edwardh, C.M. 
 James Ehnes, C.M. 
 Étienne Gaboury, C.M. 
 Clarence A. Guenter, C.M. 
 Mary Jo Haddad, C.M. 
 Garry Hilderman, C.M. 
 Stanley J. Hughes, C.M. 
 Patrick Jarvis, C.M. 
 Mary Ellen Jeans, C.M. 
 Donald M. Julien, C.M., O.N.S. 
 Claude Laberge, C.M. 
 Andrée Lortie, C.M. 
 Pierre Lucier, C.M. 
 James C. MacDougall, C.M. 
 F. Richard Matthews, C.M. 
 Alex C. Michalos, C.M. 
 Karen Minden, C.M. 
 Rita Mirwald, C.M. 
 Aftab A. Mufti, C.M. 
 Matilda Murdoch, C.M., O.N.B. 
 Guy Nadon, C.M. 
 Gordon M. Nixon, C.M., O.Ont. 
 Harold (Hal) O’Leary, C.M. 
 Gilles G. Patry, C.M. 
 Bonnie M. Patterson, C.M., O.Ont. 
 Ross H. Paul, C.M.
 Chesley D. Penney, C.M. 
 Gordon L. Porter, C.M. 
 Rosalind Prober, C.M. 
 Simone Roach, C.M. 
 Pierre Rolland, C.M. 
 Walter Rosser, C.M. 
 Ernesto L. Schiffrin, C.M. 
 Glen Sorestad, C.M. 
 Ann Southam, C.M. 
 Orysia (Irene) Sushko, C.M. 
 Louis Taillefer, C.M. 
 Robert Holmes (R. H.) Thomson, C.M. 
 David Turpin, C.M. 
 Kue Young, C.M.

Termination of membership within the Order of Canada
 Renato Giuseppe Bosisio
 Lucien Larré
 Stephen Fonyo, Jr
 Frank W. Chauvin

Order of Military Merit

Commanders of the Order of Military Merit

 Rear-Admiral Robert Andrew Davidson, C.M.M., C.D. 
 Major-General Joseph Paul André Deschamps, C.M.M., C.D. 
 Major-General Peter John Devlin, C.M.M., M.S.C., C.D. - This is a promotion within the Order
 Vice-Admiral Alistair Bruce Donaldson, C.M.M., C.D. 
 Major-General David Allison Fraser, C.M.M., M.S.C., M.S.M., C.D.- This is a promotion within the Order
 Brigadier-General David Charles Kettle, C.M.M., C.D.

Officers of the Order of Military Merit

 Colonel David Morris Belovich, O.M.M., C.D. 
 Captain (N) Joseph John Robert Richard Bergeron, O.M.M., C.D.
 Major Kevin Linus Caldwell, O.M.M., C.D. 
 Major Shawn R Murray.M.M., C.D. 
 Colonel Christopher John Coates, O.M.M., C.D. 
 Lieutenant-Colonel Dalton James Côté, O.M.M., C.D. 
 Colonel Francis Paul Crober, O.M.M., C.D. 
 Colonel Michael Donald Day, O.M.M., C.D. 
 Commander Christopher John Deere, O.M.M., C.D. 
 Major Joseph François Daniel Gagnon, O.M.M., C.D. 
 Colonel Derek William Joyce, O.M.M., C.D. 
 Lieutenant-Colonel James Gérard Kile, O.M.M., C.D. 
 Colonel Charles Adrien Lamarre, O.M.M., C.D. 
 Lieutenant-Colonel Patrice Joseph Roger Laroche, O.M.M., C.D. 
 Commodore James Roger MacIsaac, O.M.M., C.D. 
 Colonel Douglas Alan Maclean, O.M.M., C.D. 
 Colonel Dean James Milner, O.M.M., C.D. 
 Brigadier-General Gary James Patrick O’Brien, O.M.M., M.S.C., C.D. 
 Captain (N) Colin Wallace Plows, O.M.M., C.D. 
 Colonel Joseph Pierre Julien St-Amand, O.M.M., C.D. 
 Colonel Christopher Calvin Thurrott, O.M.M., M.S.M., C.D.
 Colonel Robert Schuman Williams, O.M.M., M.S.M., C.D.

Members of the Order of Military Merit

 Master Warrant Officer Jeffrey Charles Lorne Aman, M.M.M., C.D.
 Captain Dwayne William Atkinson, M.M.M., C.D. 
 Master Warrant Officer John Gerard Barnes, M.M.M., C.D. 
 Sergeant Alain André Joseph Barriault, M.M.M., C.D. 
 Petty Officer 1st Class Stephen Beastall, M.M.M., C.D. 
 Chief Warrant Officer Gary Bradley Biggar, M.M.M., C.D. 
 Warrant Officer Charles David Brady, M.M.M., C.D. 
 Chief Petty Officer 2nd Class Cheryl Dawn Bush, M.M.M., C.D. 
 Master Warrant Officer Dale William Coble, M.M.M., C.D. 
 Chief Petty Officer 2nd Class Austin Joseph Collett, M.M.M., C.D.
 Warrant Officer Edward William Dallow, M.M.M., C.D. 
 Master Warrant Officer Thaddeous Bernard D’Andrade, M.M.M., C.D.
 Sergeant Sandra Ann Dansereau, M.M.M., C.D. 
 Master Warrant Officer André Joseph Lucien Demers, M.M.M., C.D.
 Chief Warrant Officer Joseph Léopold Mario Dion, M.M.M., C.D.
 Master Warrant Officer Dany Joseph Joël Dubuc, M.M.M., C.D. 
 Master Warrant Officer Elizabeth Marguerite Dunsmore, M.M.M., C.D.
 Captain Jason Brent English, M.M.M., C.D. 
 Chief Petty Officer 2nd Class Michael David Fairfex, M.M.M., C.D.
 Master Warrant Officer Pierre Joseph Frenette, M.M.M., C.D. 
 Chief Warrant Officer Joseph René Raoul Stéphane Guy, M.M.M., C.D.
 Warrant Officer Kelly Todd Grant, M.M.M., C.D. 
 Chief Petty Officer 2nd Class Gilles André Grégoire, M.M.M., C.D.
 Chief Warrant Officer Joseph Sandor Gyuk, M.M.M., C.D. 
 Sergeant Thomas William Hale, M.M.M., C.D. 
 Major Marie Gisèle Carmen Hamel, M.M.M., C.D. 
 Captain Peter William Hamilton, M.M.M., C.D. 
 Chief Warrant Officer Stuart Gordon Hartnell, M.M.M., C.D. 
 Chief Warrant Officer Tom Carl Hennessey, M.M.M., C.D. 
 Captain Lewis Edwin Irvine, M.M.M., C.D. 
 Master Warrant Officer James Robert Jeckell, M.M.M., C.D. 
 Captain Lennard Mark Johnston, M.M.M., C.D. 
 Warrant Officer Lewis Harry Johnstone, M.M.M., C.D. 
 Master Warrant Officer Raymond Chester King, M.M.M., C.D. 
 Master Warrant Officer Roger William King, M.M.M., C.D. 
 Sergeant Manon Gina Langlois, M.M.M., C.D. 
 Master Warrant Officer Michel Joseph Sylva Lavallée, M.M.M., C.D.
 Captain Patrick Joseph Lee, M.M.M., C.D. 
 Chief Petty Officer 2nd Class Thomas Allan Lizotte, M.M.M., C.D.
 Warrant Officer Patrick Timothy Love, M.M.M., C.D. 
 Chief Warrant Officer Kenneth Charles Lutz, M.M.M., C.D. 
 Captain Donna Anne MacAulay, M.M.M., C.D. 
 Chief Warrant Officer Donald Alexander MacIsaac, M.M.M., C.D.
 Major Leslie Robert Mader, M.M.M., C.D. 
 Chief Petty Officer 2nd Class Bradley James Main, M.M.M., C.D.
 Master Warrant Officer Kevin James Mathers, M.M.M., C.D.
 Chief Warrant Officer Michael Lawrence McDonald, M.S.C., M.M.M., C.D.
 Chief Petty Officer 2nd Class Eric Rudyard Meredith, M.M.M., C.D.
 Master Warrant Officer Marie Carole Fernande Monsigneur, M.M.M., C.D.
 Warrant Officer Lawrence Russell Mullen, M.M.M., C.D. 
 Master Warrant Officer Sean Joseph Murphy, M.M.M., C.D. 
 Petty Officer 2nd Class Peter Francis Neville, M.M.M., C.D. 
 Chief Warrant Officer André Joseph Gérald Normandin, M.M.M., C.D.
 Chief Warrant Officer Marc André Joseph Pelletier, M.M.M., C.D.
 L’adjudant-chef Marc André Joseph Pelletier, M.M.M., C.D.
 Master Warrant Officer David Charles Phillips, M.M.M., C.D. 
 Warrant Officer Stephen Glen Piccolo, M.M.M., C.D. 
 Captain Peter Joseph Pitcher, M.M.M., C.D. 
 Captain Lorne Benedict Plemel, M.M.M., C.D. 
 Sergeant (Canadian Ranger) Markussie Qinuajuak, M.M.M., C.D.
 Chief Warrant Officer Joseph Ramsay, M.M.M., C.D. 
 Master Warrant Officer Glen Richard Rideout, M.M.M., C.D. 
 Chief Warrant Officer Pedro Eduardo Rosa, M.M.M., C.D. 
 L’adjudant-chef Pedro Eduardo Rosa, M.M.M., C.D. 
 Warrant Officer Claudette Jacqueline Saunders, M.M.M., C.D. 
 Petty Officer 1st Class Patrick James Johannes Saunders, M.M.M., C.D.
 Chief Warrant Officer Michael Gerald Scarcella, M.M.M., C.D. 
 Petty Officer 1st Class Cavel Thomas Shebib, M.M.M., C.D. 
 Chief Warrant Officer Anthony James Slack, M.M.M., C.D. 
 Master Warrant Officer Roland Wavel Smith, M.M.M., C.D. 
 Master Warrant Officer Jennifer Lynne Ste-Croix, M.M.M., C.D. 
 Sergeant Yan St-Pierre, M.M.M., C.D. 
 Captain Jean-Yves Taschereau, M.M.M., C.D. 
 Master Warrant Officer Sharman Patrick Thomas, M.M.M., C.D. 
 Chief Petty Officer 1st Class Luc Joseph Royal Tremblay, M.M.M., C.D.
 Master Warrant Officer Pierre Joseph Richard Tremblay, M.M.M., C.D.
 L’adjudant-maître Pierre Joseph Richard Tremblay, M.M.M., C.D.
 Chief Petty Officer 2nd Class Charles Melvin Frederick Trombley, M.M.M., C.D.
 Master Warrant Officer Donald Wellesley Tupper, M.M.M., C.D. 
 Captain Darren Edward Turner, M.M.M., C.D. 
 Warrant Officer Michael Bernard Vandepol, M.M.M., C.D. 
 Chief Warrant Officer Armand Joseph Simon Vinet, M.M.M., C.D.
 Sergeant Leslie James Wilson, M.M.M., C.D. 
 Chief Petty Officer 2nd Class Kevin Allen Woods, M.M.M., C.D. 
 Major John Garnet Zoellner, M.M.M., C.D. 
 Captain Roland Gregory Zwicker, M.M.M., C.D.

Order of Merit of the Police Forces

Commander of the Order of Merit of the Police Forces

 Assistant Director General Steven Chabot

Officers of the Order of Merit of the Police Forces

 Deputy Commissioner Lawrence Graham Beechey 
 Chief Constable Jamie Hamilton Graham
 Deputy Commissioner J. V. N. (Vincent) Hawkes 
 Deputy Commissioner Christopher D. Lewis - This is a promotion within the Order
 Assistant Commissioner Robert Wilfred Paulson - This is a promotion within the Order
 Inspector Joseph Lance Valcour

Members of the Order of Merit of the Police Forces

 Chief Keith John Atkinson 
 Superintendent Bradley Blair 
 Staff Sergeant Murray Elijah Brown 
 Sergeant John William Burchill 
 Chief Constable Douglas James Cessford 
 Sergeant G. Shawn Coady, C.D. 
 Deputy Chief Constable John Alexander Ducker 
 Chief Inspector André Fortin 
 Corporal Christopher G. Gosselin 
 Sergeant Stewart C. Kellock, C.D.
 Assistant Commissioner Wayne Alexander Lang 
 Ms. Brenda Lawson 
 Chief Barry D. MacKnight 
 Chief Superintendent William Fraser MacRae 
 Deputy Chief Michael S. Mann 
 Superintendent H. Alfred Niedtner 
 Inspector André Péloquin 
 Deputy Chief John Allan Redford 
 Inspector Ronald ‘Dean’ Robinson 
 Constable Tom Stamatakis 
 Director Marc St-Laurent 
 Deputy Chief Constable Stephen C. Sweeney 
 Detective Sergeant James Arthur Van Allen

Termination of appointment within the Order
 Sergeant Warren S. Gherasim

Royal Victorian Order

Commander of the Royal Victorian Order
 Sheila-Marie Cook
 Dwight MacAulay - This is a promotion within the Order
Dwight MacAulay (July 4, 2010)

Lieutenant of the Royal Victorian Order
 Raymond Novak

Member of the Royal Victorian Order
 Bernard Corrigan 
 Sylvie Gervais 
 Terry Guillon 
 Caroline Marchildon 
 Christopher McCreery
 Isabelle McLeod 
 Lieutenant-Commander Scott Nelson
 Madeleine Rinfret-Moore
 Florence Sassine

Most Venerable Order of the Hospital of St. John of Jerusalem

Bailiff Grand Cross of the Order of St. John
 John Chew Mah, C.D. - This is a promotion within the Order

Knights and Dames of the Order of St. John
 The Honourable Philip S. Lee, C.M., O.M.
 Frederick Richard Bruce, M.O.M.
 Her Honour, the Honourable Ann Meekitjuk Hanson
 Her Honour, the Honourable Geraldine Van Bibber
 His Honour, the Honourable Anthony Wilfred James Whitford
 Lesley Robert Chipperfield
 Joyce Rose Hart
 Lieutenant-Commander (Retired) Darin Edward Reeves, C.D.
 Honorary Lieutenant Colonel Solomon J. Rolingher
 Rear Admiral (Retired) Robert Dmytro Yanow, C.D. 
 Colin Borden Bachynski
 Sharon E. Cole
 Lieutenant Colonel (Retired) Arthur Richard William Jordan, C.D.
 Marc Jutras
 Raymond L. Roberts, C.D.

Commanders of the Order of St. John
 Lieutenant Colonel (Retired) Jeffrey Robert Cairns, C.D.
 Claire Cecilia Campbell
 Major (Retired) Jean-Robert Gagnon, C.D.
 Lieutenant (N) David M. Connelly, C.D.
 Lieutenant-Commander (Retired) Peter B. Ferst, C.D.
 Belinda Mary Mitchell
 Captain Leslie Jack Patten, C.D.
 Jordy Reichson
 Major Justin P.K. Schmidt-Clever, C.D.
 Kenneth Ross Turriff, Bridgewater, A.D.C.
 Honorary Colonel Robert Harold Vandewater

Officers of the Order of St. John
 Douglas Anthony Alberts
 Christian Beaulieu
 Judith Ann Belding
 André Bilodeau
 Jean K. Chute
 Patrick Thomas Cureton
 Trevor James Day
 Robert P. Doyle
 Donald Drover
 Constable Paul E. Dunford
 Nancy Elliott-Greenwood
 Patrick David Flynn
 Frederika E. M. Gibson
 David John Griffiths
 David Norman Schofield Harris, C.D.
 Vivian Carole Hould
 Ian Alan Knightbridge
 Frank Ferguson Lawson
 Colonel Thomas Charles Ray Lawson
 André Lepage
 Major Rick Maxwell Lewis
 William Masson
 Christopher McCreery
 Richard Andrew Muller
 Francis Aloysius O’Reilly
 Captain Brian James Patterson
 Darlene Violet Perkins
 Catherine Scollay
 Mark T. Walker
 Philip Clarke
 Honorary Captain Lionel José Goffart
 Major (Retired) Victor M. Knowlton, C.D.
 Andrew James Philpot
 Ronald Richard

Members of the Order of St. John
 José Carlos Alves
 Gloria Ruth Armstrong
 Laura J. Assinck
 Hortense Audet
 Gail Louise Bailey
 Frank Beals
 William George Beatty
 David Bélanger
 Hazel Ann Blundell
 Jesse Shane Boszormeny
 Pierre Boudreault
 James W. Brown
 Lynn Carter
 Sheila H. Carter
 Alan Wai-Lap Chan
 Daniel Jon Chevrier
 Warrant Officer Robert Graham Clark, C.D.
 Sylvain Cloutier(posthumously)
 Geoffrey Alan Collins
 Mary Clare Courtland
 Henri Cyr
 Bernard Deschênes
 Kevin Despot
 Stephen Douglas Devine
 Élizabeth Dougherty
 Bruce M. England
 André Fournier
 Celine Froment
 Natalie Fyke
 Jean-Philippe Gadbois
 Denis Gendreau
 Stéphane Gignac
 Sylvie Goneau
 Joanne Claire Green
 Captain Ronald Larry Green, C.D.
 Nigel Robert Gumley
 Chief Petty Officer 1st Class (Retired) Peter Michael Hagan, C.D.
 George Kenneth Hammond
 Corporal Keith R. Hendricks
 Ronald Eugene Henshaw
 Ryan Bradford Hoogendoorn
 Claudette Houle
 Nancy L. Hughes
 Joerg Andreas Huth
 Robert Douglas Ingram
 Mohamed Jama
 Marthe Jean
 Windie-Lee Jeider
 Captain Alfred Carl King, C.D.
 Sandra Lynn Ladd
 Master Corporal Marie Corinne Nadine Laflamme, C.D.
 Travis Ryan Lanoway
 Sean Large
 Glen Allan Larson
 Benedict Wan Chiu Lau
 Lieutenant Candice Leigh Levesque
 Margaret Jessie Manson
 Colonel Steven Craig McQuitty
 Claudia Maria Naaykens
 John Michael Prno
 Nicole Suzanne Renkema
 Inspector John Paul Richards
 Debra Lynn Robertson
 Major General Walter Semianiw
 Mohammad Imran Shamsi
 Denise Ann Smith
 Angeline Tham
 Stacey L. Timmons
 Brigadier General (Retired) Kevin Gerald Troughton, C.D.
 Mervin Wayne Unger
 Jonathan Campbell Warren
 Dorothy Florence Watson
 Helen Whitehead
 Captain Michael Richard Wionzek, C.D.
 Kenneth Walter Bilicki
 Captain Élise Corriveau
 Alexander De Zordo
 Jean Fournier, C.M., C.Q.
 Gordon D. Frowen
 Steven D. Gaetz
 Heather Elizabeth Hayne
 Peter William R. Hogan, A.D.C.
 Sandra M. Karr
 Nicole Elizabeth Knee
 Darwin Lai
 Alain L. J. Laurencelle
 Hong Ting Law
 Kevin Gee Keung Li
 Annette Yvonne Lumbis
 Serge Henry Joseph Malaison
 Kevin Robert Edward McCormick
 Assistant Commissioner (Retired) Darrell Wesley McFadyen
 Kellie Mitchell
 Stacie Lee Osborne
 Jules Pinard, A.D.C.
 Wansey Poon
 Patricia Ann Skjolde

Provincial Honours

National Order of Québec

Grand Officers of the National Order of Québec

 Jean Béliveau, C.C., G.O.Q.
 Monique Mercure, C.C., G.O.Q.

Honorary Officer
 James H. DOUGLAS, O.Q

Officers of the National Order of Québec

 Maryse ALCINDOR, O.Q.
 Camille DAGENAIS, C.C., O.Q.
 Bernard DESCÔTEAUX, O.Q.
 René DUSSAULT, O.Q.
 Louise FORAND-SAMSON, O.Q.
 Dr. Jean-Claude FOURON, O.Q.
 Roger FRAPPIER, O.Q. 
 Raymond GARNEAU, O.C., O.Q.
 Élaine HÉMOND, O.Q.
 L. Jacques MÉNARD, O.C., O.Q.
 Clément RICHARD, O.Q.
 Richard TREMBLAY, O.Q.

Knight of the National Order of Québec

 Léonard AUCOIN, C.Q.
 Neil BISSOONDATH, C.Q. 
 Huguette BOILARD, C.Q.
 Robert CHICOINE, C.Q.
 Christine COLIN, C.Q. 
 Roland DORÉ, O.C., C.Q.
 Richard G. GERVAIS, C.Q. 
 Renée HUDON, C.Q.
 François-Mario LABBÉ, C.Q. 
 Michel LOUVAIN, C.Q.
 Sister Andrée MÉNARD, C.Q. 
 Wajdi Mouawad, O.C., C.Q. 
 Mona NEMER, C.Q. 
 Jacques PERREAULT, C.Q. 
 Claudine ROY, C.Q. 
 Hubert SACY, C.Q.
 Donat SAVOIE, C.Q. 
 Larry SMITH, C.Q.
 Angèle ST-YVES, C.Q. 
 Yuli TUROVSKY, C.Q.

Saskatchewan Order of Merit

 Maurice (Mo) Bundon, S.O.M.
 Donald E. Kramer, S.O.M., LL.D. (1926‐2018)
 Dr. Janice MacKinnon, C.M., S.O.M.
 Dr. J.D. (Jack) Mollard, O.C., S.O.M., LL.D.
 Elizabeth Raum, S.O.M.
 Dr. Douglas A. Schmeiser, S.O.M., Q.C. (1934‐2018)
 Myrna F. Yuzicapi, S.O.M

Order of Ontario

Suhayya Abu-Hakima 
Russell Bannock 
Gail Beck
Joseph Chin 
Lynn Factor 
Gerald Fagan 
Nigel Fisher 
Jacques Flamand 
Lillie Johnson 
Ignat Kaneff 
Mobeenuddin Hassan Khaja 
Elizabeth Ann Kinsella 
Huguette Labelle 
Elizabeth Le Geyt
Clare Lewis 
Louise Logue 
Gordon McBean 
Wilma Morrison 
James Orbinski 
Coulter Osborne 
Chris Paliare 
Gilles Patry 
Dave Shannon 
Molly Shoichet 
Howard Sokolowski 
Edward Sonshine 
Reginald Stackhouse 
David Staines 
Martin Teplitsky 
Dave Toycen 
John Ronald Wakegijig 
Elizabeth Hillman Waterston

Order of British Columbia

 Jacob (Jack) Austin; 
 Chief Tony Hunt; 
 Dr. Robert Brunham; 
 Barbara Ward-Burkitt; 
 Dr. Julio Montaner; 
 Dan Doyle; 
 Brad Bennett; 
 Marco Marra;
 John Furlong; 
 Robert (Bob) Hindmarch; 
 Patricia (Patti) Leigh; 
 Pauline Hilistis Waterfall; 
 Christopher Rose; 
 Frankie Edroff; 
 Milan Ilich

Alberta Order of Excellence

Order of Prince Edward Island

Order of Manitoba

Order of New Brunswick

Order of Nova Scotia

Order of Newfoundland and Labrador

Military Valour Decorations

Star of Military Valour

 WARRANT OFFICER DAVID GEORGE SHULTZ, S.M.V., C.D.
 MASTER CORPORAL JEREMY PINCHIN, S.M.V.

Medal of Military Valour

 MASTER CORPORAL MICHAEL C. J. BURSEY, M.M.V. 
 SERGEANT MARTIN JOSEPH JEAN CÔTÉ, M.M.V., C.D. 
 WARRANT OFFICER ROBIN JOHN CRANE, M.M.V., C.D. 
 CORPORAL TYLER BRIAN MYRONIUK, M.M.V. 
 CORPORAL MARK C. W. EJDRYGIEWICZ, M.M.V. 
 MASTER CORPORAL BRENT W. L. GALLANT, M.M.V. 
 SERGEANT Shawn Murray, M.M.V., C.D. 
 SERGEANT JAYSON WILLIAM KAPITANIUK, M.M.V. 
 CORPORAL JORDAN E. KOCHAN, M.M.V. 
 MASTER CORPORAL PAUL D. RACHYNSKI, M.M.V. 
 CORPORAL ANTHONY J. R. ROTONDI, M.M.V. 
 WARRANT OFFICER DALE MILTON VERGE, M.M.V., C.D.
 CORPORAL RICHARD L. ANDERSON, M.M.V. 
 CORPORAL MARK ROBERT MCLAREN, M.M.V. 
 CORPORAL JOSHUA O’TOOLE, M.M.V. 
 MASTER CORPORAL DAVID RICHARD TEDFORD, M.M.V., C.D. 
 MASTER CORPORAL MICHAEL TRAUNER, M.M.V.
 WARRANT OFFICER MICHAEL WILLIAM JACKSON, M.M.V., C.D. 
 MASTER CORPORAL PAUL ALEXANDER MUNROE, M.M.V., C.D. 
 MASTER CORPORAL JEREMY JOSEPH JAMES LEBLANC, M.M.V.

Canadian Bravery Decorations

Star of Courage

 Sergeant Bryant Wood
 Casey Marie Peirce
 Alexander Bruce Scott
 Miguel Gonzalez
 Luc Paquette
 Miranda Suggitt
 Michael Thomas Westwell

Medal of Bravery

 Jimmy Victor Beardy
 Lieutenant Denis Beaulieu
 Constable Patrick Benoit
 Terry Bratton
 Gary Victor Brown
 Ryan Sterling Burry
 Benjamin Loren Correos (posthumous)
 Louis-Paul Courbron
 Constable Frédéric Couture
 Elaine Dare
 Dean R. DeJoseph
 Frédérick Dionne
 James Donovan
 Frédéric Dufresne
 Kimberly Friesen
 Kimpton Gagnon-Després
 Michel Harvey
 Raphaël Harvey Bérard
 Norbert Hébert
 Jeffrey Hopkins
 RCMP Constable Michelle Allison Knopp
 Shawn Joseph Lahey
 Alexis Laliberté
 Leading Seaman Roxanne Anneke Lalonde (posthumous)
 Sergeant Roger Chadwick Lane
 Constable Martin Langlois
 Paul Linklater
 Gillian Irene MacAulay
 Chris MacLeod
 Sylvain Joseph Marcoux
 Guillaume Massé
 Scott Lee Joseph Moody (deceased)
 Yves Pilotte (posthumous)
 Hady Quan (posthumous)
 Constable Sean Ralph
 Constable Alain Rochette
 Tanya Silveira
 Cody Brian Sloot
 Tommy Thériault
 Tanya Lee Waldriff
 Michael Braden Walker
 Sergeant Bryant Wood
 David H. R. Byrd 
 Michael D. Byrd 
 Thomas James Dodd (posthumous) 
 Robert Edward Dorie 
 Robin Fabiani 
 Constable Michael Verney Gallant 
 Constable Phillip Kolody 
 Doug Knill 
 Samantha-Joe Larose 
 Bruce Lavallee 
 Donald Morrison 
 Marc Patterson 
 Stuart Pringle 
 Corporal Gabriel Proulx 
 Francis Quevillon 
 Constable Dale George Sleightholme 
 Constable Paul Allan Spencelayh 
 Mike André Toupin 
 Daniel White
 Sergeant B. John Ayers
 Leading Seaman Robert T. Binder (deceased)
 Steve Blake
 Dale Brady
 Shane Michael Doucette
 Constable Lionel Girault
 Sergeant Michael Johnston
 Master Corporal David Frederick Taylor King, C.D.
 Sergeant Patrick Lalonde
 Guy Lavoie
 Able Seaman Jaret A. McQueen
 Constable Jean Milliard
 Constable Cal Traversy
 Constable Clifford Watson
 Andrea Wiznuk
 Constable Nick Bell
 Lieutenant-Colonel Douglas Wynn Baird, C.D.
 Constable Robert Bérubé
 Scott Borlase
 Joseph Henry Roland Bouliane
 Constable Benoit Brissette
 John Peter Chatterton
 Sergeant Steve Desgagné
 Daisy Flamand
 Richard Frauley
 Jared Douglas Gagen
 Isabelle Gagnon
 Master-Corporal Julien Gauthier
 Major William Robertson Green, C.D.
 Blair William Allan Hocking
 Sergeant Joseph André Hotton, M.B.∗, C.D. - This is a second award of this decoration
 Ernest Jean
 Marjorie Jean-Baptiste
 Tim Kautaq
 RCMP Constable Alfred Douglas Lavallee
 Thomas Manuel
 Warren Bruce Miller
 Pascale Pelletier
 Sergeant Joseph Kenneth Penman
 Michaël Perreault Giroux
 Stephen Power
 Master Warrant Officer Hamish Jackson Seggie, C.D.
 Warrant Officer Shaun Spence, C.D.
 Edward Stirling
 Tami Elizabeth Strickland
 Constable Wayne Thompson
 Philippe Tremblay
 Art Unruh
 Chad Verch
 William Watt
 Abebe Yohannes
 Hermann Zarbel

Meritorious Service Decorations

Meritorious Service Cross (Military Division)

 COMMANDER CRAIG ALAN BAINES, M.S.C., C.D. 
 LIEUTENANT-GENERAL HANS-OTTO BUDDE, M.S.C. of the German Army
 GENERAL BANTZ JOHN CRADDOCK, M.S.C. of the United States Army
 REAR-ADMIRAL ROBERT ANDREW DAVIDSON, M.S.C., C.D. 
 MASTER WARRANT OFFICER RODNEY ALBERT DEARING, M.S.C., C.D. 
 COMMANDER PIERRE CHRISTOPHE DICKINSON, M.S.C., C.D. 
 SERGEANT SHAWN E. HARRISON, M.S.C., C.D. 
 LIEUTENANT-GENERAL JOSEPH GUY MARC LESSARD, C.M.M., M.S.C., C.D. 
 WARRANT OFFICER JOHN ROBERT MCNABB, M.S.C., C.D. 
 LIEUTENANT-COLONEL DARRYL ALBERT MILLS, M.S.C., C.D. 
 CHIEF WARRANT OFFICER GIOVANNI MORETTI, M.M.M., M.S.C., C.D. 
 GENERAL VICTOR EUGENE RENUART, Jr., M.S.C., of the United States Air Force
 BRIGADIER-GENERAL DENIS WILLIAM THOMPSON, O.M.M., M.S.C., C.D.
 SERGEANT NICHOLAS SAMUEL JAMES DERIGER, M.S.C., C.D. 
 SERGEANT DARRELL LAWRENCE SPENCE, M.S.C., C.D. 
 LIEUTENANT-COLONEL DANA JEFFREY WOODWORTH, M.S.C., C.D.
 SERGEANT JOSEPH MARTIN BRINK, M.S.C. 
 BRIGADIER-GENERAL JOSEPH RENÉ MARCEL GUY LAROCHE, O.M.M., M.S.C., C.D.

Meritorious Service Medal (Military Division)

 MAJOR JAMES EDWARD ALLEN, M.S.M., C.D. 
 CHIEF WARRANT OFFICER SHEILA ALAINE BLAIR, M.M.M., M.S.M., C.D.
 COLONEL JOSEPH PATRICK BREEN, M.S.M. of the United States Air Force
 WARRANT OFFICER TODD BARRY BUCHANAN, M.S.M., C.D.
 COLONEL JAMIESON CADE, M.S.M., C.D. 
 COLONEL GORDON DAVID CORBOULD, M.S.M., C.D. 
 MAJOR-GENERAL JONKHEER J. HARMEN DE JONGE, M.S.M. Royal Netherlands Army
 MAJOR MICHAEL ROY DEUTSCH, M.S.M., C.D. 
 COLONEL JEAN-PIERRE DURAN, M.S.M. 
 WARRANT OFFICER MICHAEL PATRICK FOREST, M.S.M., C.D. 
 COLONEL SEAN G. FRIDAY, M.S.M., C.D. 
 MAJOR STACY ALLAN GRUBB, M.S.M., C.D. 
 MAJOR JOSEPH ANTONIO MARCEL LOUIS HAMEL, M.S.M., C.D. 
 COLONEL CHARLES MARK HAZLETON, O.M.M., M.S.M., C.D. 
 COLONEL YANN JOHN HIDIROGLOU, M.S.M., C.D. (Retired) 
 LIEUTENANT-COLONEL KERRY WILLIAM HORLOCK, M.S.M., C.D.
 WARRANT OFFICER KEVIN THOMAS JOHNSON, M.S.M., C.D. 
 COLONEL VIHAR GOVIND JOSHI, M.S.M., C.D. 
 CHIEF WARRANT OFFICER CHRISTOPHER AVARD KAYE, M.M.M., M.S.M., C.D. 
 COLONEL PAUL KEDDY, M.S.M., C.D. 
 CAPTAIN PETER PAUL KLEINSCHMIDT, M.S.M., C.D. 
 COMMANDER KELLY BRIAN LARKIN, M.S.M., C.D. 
 MAJOR JOHN ROBERT PRUDENT LATULIPPE, M.S.M., C.D. 
 COLONEL THOMAS J. MCGRATH, M.S.M. of the United States Army
 COLONEL SCOTT ANDREW MCLEOD, M.S.M., C.D
 MAJOR-GENERAL CHRISTOPHER D. MILLER, M.S.M., of the United States Air Force
 COMMANDANT YVES MINJOLLET, M.S.M., of the French Armed Forces
 CORPORAL MARC L. S. MURRAY, M.S.M. 
 VICE ADMIRAL ROBERT B. MURRETT, M.S.M., of the United States Navy
 COLONEL PHILIP M. L. NAPIER, M.S.M., of the British Army
 COMMANDER STEVEN PAGET, M.S.M., C.D. 
 MAJOR ERIC JEAN PEREY, M.S.M., C.D. 
 MASTER CORPORAL JACOB N. PETTEN, M.S.M. 
 WARRANT OFFICER JASON GUY PICKARD, M.S.M., C.D. 
 MAJOR CATHERINE ENID POTTS, M.S.M., C.D. 
 CORPORAL JOHN CLIFTON WAYNE PRIOR, M.S.M. 
 COLONEL JOSEPH PAUL JACQUES RICARD, M.S.M. 
 COLONEL COLIN P. RICHARDSON, M.S.M. 
 COLONEL JEAN-FRANÇOIS RIFFOU, M.S.M., C.D. 
 MAJOR ROBERT TENNANT RITCHIE, M.S.M., C.D. 
 CAPTAIN (N) BRENDAN RYAN, M.S.M., C.D. 
 CORPORAL CAMERON M. SMITHERS, M.S.M. 
 LIEUTENANT-COLONEL MARTHA-ANNE PAULE STOUFFER, M.S.M., C.D. 
 CORPORAL RORY E. SWANSON, M.S.M. 
 MAJOR-GENERAL DENNIS CHARLES TABBERNOR, C.M.M., M.S.M., C.D. 
 CHIEF WARRANT OFFICER CHRISTOPHER ARNOLD WHITE, M.M.M., M.S.M., C.D. 
 COMMANDER JOHN AUBREY WILLISTON, M.S.M., C.D. 
 WARRANT OFFICER TERENCE CHARLES WOLANIUK, M.S.M., C.D.
 MAJOR MARK G. WUENNENBERG, M.S.M., C.D.
 WARRANT OFFICER RUSSELL KEITH ARSENAULT, M.S.M., C.D. 
 MAJOR OREST BABIJ, M.S.M., C.D. 
 LIEUTENANT-COLONEL ROGER RONALD BARRETT, M.S.M., C.D.
 LIEUTENANT-COLONEL JAMES FREDERICK CAMSELL, M.S.M., C.D.
 LIEUTENANT-COLONEL FRANCES CHILTON-MACKAY, O.M.M., M.S.M., C.D. 
 COLONEL CHRISTOPHER JOHN COATES, M.S.M., C.D.
 MASTER WARRANT OFFICER KEVIN JOSEPH RALPH DONOVAN, M.S.M., C.D. 
 WARRANT OFFICER RICHARD DUBÉ, M.S.M., C.D. 
 MASTER WARRANT OFFICER LUC EMOND, M.S.M., C.D. 
 CAPTAIN DAVID FEARON, M.S.M., C.D. 
 MASTER WARRANT OFFICER DAVID EUGENE FISHER, M.S.M., C.D. 
 COLONEL RICHARD JOSEPH DELPHIS GERVAIS, M.S.M., C.D.
 CHIEF WARRANT OFFICER ERNEST JOSEPH HALL, M.M.M., M.S.M., C.D. 
 MASTER CORPORAL WILLIAM THOMAS HOGGARTH, M.S.M., C.D. 
 BRIGADIER-GENERAL ALAN JOHN HOWARD, M.S.M., C.D. 
 LIEUTENANT-COLONEL DANIEL S. HURLBUT, M.S.M. of the United States Army
 MASTER WARRANT OFFICER LEWIS DUTHIE JOSEPH LAVOIE, M.S.M., C.D.
 MAJOR ROBERT WALTER MCBRIDE, M.S.M., C.D. 
 MASTER WARRANT OFFICER SHAWN ANTHONY MERCER, M.S.M., C.D. 
 LIEUTENANT-COLONEL SCOTT MILLER, M.S.M. of the United States Air Force
 COLONEL THEODORE E. OSOWSKI, M.S.M. of the United States Air Force
 MASTER WARRANT OFFICER ERIC JOHN ROLFE, M.S.M., C.D. 
 LIEUTENANT-COLONEL JOSEPH STEPHEN SHIPLEY, M.S.M., C.D. 
 MAJOR DEAN DWAYNE TREMBLAY, M.S.M., C.D. 
 MAJOR RUSSELL NEAL WASHBURN, M.S.M., C.D.
 MAJOR GEOFFREY ARTHUR ABTHORPE, M.S.M., C.D. 
 MASTER CORPORAL JOSEPH LEONARD ARSENAULT, M.S.M., C.D. 
 MAJOR JONATHAN CLAUDE YVON BOUCHARD, M.S.M., C.D.
 CAPTAIN JEFFREY MIDDLETON POWELL, M.S.M. 
 MASTER CORPORAL JEFFREY GORDON SPENCE, M.S.M., C.D. 
 COLONEL TONY BATTISTA, M.S.M., C.D. 
 CORPORAL JOSEPH RUDOLF ÉRIC BEAUCLAIR, M.S.M., C.D. 
 CAPTAIN CRAIG WAYNE DESJARDINS, M.B., M.S.M., C.D. 
 CORPORAL EMELIE PILON, M.S.M. 
 PETTY OFFICER 2ND CLASS BARBARA AGNES BENSON, M.S.M., C.D.
 MAJOR TIMOTHY CHARLES BYERS, M.S.M., C.D. 
 LIEUTENANT-COLONEL SCOTT NORMAN CLANCY, M.S.M., C.D.  
 CHIEF WARRANT OFFICER ROBERT DALY, M.S.M., C.D. 
 CHIEF WARRANT OFFICER PATRICK JOSEPH EARLES, M.S.M., C.D. 
 CHIEF PETTY OFFICER 1ST CLASS JOCELYN JOSEPH RENÉ FRÉCHETTE, M.S.M., C.D. 
 COLONEL J. J. MARTIN GIRARD, M.S.M., C.D. 
 COMMODORE RICHARD WESTON GREENWOOD, O.M.M., M.S.M., C.D. 
 SERGEANT RENAY MARIE GROVES, M.S.M., C.D. 
 MASTER WARRANT OFFICER JOHN WILLIAM HOOYER, M.S.M., C.D. 
 LIEUTENANT-COLONEL JAMES ANDREW IRVINE, M.S.M., C.D. 
 CHIEF WARRANT OFFICER MICHAEL RAYMOND LACHARITE, M.S.M., C.D. 
 COLONEL JEAN-MARC LANTHIER, M.S.C., M.S.M., C.D. 
 CAPTAIN TYLER LAVIGNE, M.S.M. 
 CORPORAL DERICK R. LEWIS, M.S.M. 
 MAJOR MARTIN ANDRE LIPCSEY, M.S.M., C.D. 
 CAPTAIN STEVEN E. LUCE, M.S.M. of the United States Navy
 MAJOR JOSEPH GILBERT LÉON MCCAULEY, M.S.M., C.D. 
 CAPTAIN(N) ARTHUR GERARD MCDONALD, M.S.M., C.D. 
 COLONEL MICHAEL MCLEAN, O.M.M., M.S.M., C.D. 
 CHIEF WARRANT OFFICER MARK HENRY MILLER, M.M.M., M.S.M., C.D. 
 MASTER WARRANT OFFICER ROBERT JOSEPH MONTAGUE, M.M.M., M.S.M., C.D.
 MAJOR STEVEN JOHN VINCENT NOLAN, M.S.M., C.D. 
 LIEUTENANT-COLONEL CHRISTOPHER KENNETH PENNY, M.S.M.  
 CORPORAL CURTIS J. STEPHENS, M.S.M. 
 LIEUTENANT-COLONEL DUART PAUL TOWNSEND, M.S.M., C.D. 
 CAPTAIN(N) THOMAS CHARLES TULLOCH, M.S.M., C.D. 
 COLONEL JEAN-MICHEL DÉSIRÉ VERNEY, M.S.M. of the French Army
 CAPTAIN CONNIE NOREEN WATSON, M.S.M., C.D. 
 SERGEANT CHRISTOPHER STUART WHALEN, M.S.M., C.D.

Mention in Dispatches

 Private Jeffrey Atlee 
 Private David C. Banks 
 Captain Robert E. Barker 
 Captain Ross William Bonnell 
 Warrant Officer Daniel William Bouchie, C.D. 
 Corporal Christopher R. Busche 
 Captain Christopher W. Carthew 
 Corporal Erkin Cicekci 
 Captain Jeffery J. Code
 Corporal Shaun David Copeland 
 Captain Raymond Jean-Claude Corby 
 Sergeant Steven Alan Corcoran, C.D. 
 Lieutenant Aaron Edward Corey 
 Captain Simon J. Cox 
 Warrant Officer Robin John Crane, M.M.V., C.D. 
 Corporal Sheldon R. G. Crawford 
 Sergeant James Robert George Davidson, C.D. 
 Corporal Jean-Guy Ross Dinelle 
 Master Corporal Hugh R. Dixon 
 Private Aaron A. Dodge 
 Sergeant Wayne Bernard Dunphy, C.D. 
 Sergeant Timothy Wayne Fletcher, C.D. 
 Corporal Kevin J. Foley 
 Private Phillip A. Frank 
 Corporal Lucus John Fuller 
 Corporal David S. Giles 
 Corporal Dustin M. Girard 
 Corporal Casey A. E. Gray 
 Master Corporal Kelly A. Harding, C.D. 
 Private Ryan E. Harding 
 Warrant Officer Paul Justin Holwell, C.D. 
 Private Bradley K. Johnston 
 Warrant Officer Terry Thomas Jones, C.D. 
 Corporal Carl B. A. Kriwez 
 Private Cody R. Kuluski 
 Master Corporal Joseph E. Leger 
 Corporal Clayton D. MacLean 
 Private Justin G. MacPherson 
 Corporal Matthew A. McLean 
 Corporal Lee Allan Miller 
 Corporal Tyler Brian Myroniuk, M.M.V. 
 Master Corporal Brent Simon Nolasco 
 Corporal Vincent Jacques Peters 
 Warrant Officer Jason Guy Pickard, M.S.M., C.D. 
 Sergeant Matthew Timothy Pronk, C.D. 
 Corporal Patrick J. R. A. Ranger 
 Master Corporal Johnathon E. Scharf 
 Private Andrew Brett Smallman 
 Sergeant Paul Dean Sprenger, C.D. 
 Sergeant Derek Ashley Thompson, C.D. 
 Private Jason C. Toole 
 Corporal Calvin T. Vickerman 
 Lieutenant Daniel J. Vincent 
 Warrant Officer Mike Eric Vollick, C.D.
 Master Corporal Kevin William Walker, C.D. 
 Private Ryan K. Waring 
 Corporal James Craig White 
 Master Corporal Ricky L. Woods
 Captain Shawn Christopher Dumbreck
 Master Warrant Officer Rene F. Kiens, C.D.
 Corporal David A. MacDonald
 Corporal Sebastien Picard
 Private Ben L. Rasmussen
 Private Kiernan R. Underwood

Commonwealth and Foreign Orders, Decorations and Medal awarded to Canadians

From Her Majesty The Queen in Right of the United Kingdom

Operation Service Medals

Operational Service Medal (Iraq)
 Major Murray Allen Carlson

Operational Service Medal (Afghanistan) with Clasp
 Captain Adam B. Battista

Operational Service Medal (Afghanistan)
 Master Corporal Corey Edwards
 Captain Jean-François Gauvin

From the President of Austria

Grand Decoration of Honour in Silver
 Dr. Franz A. J. Szabo

From His Majesty The King of the Belgians

Officer of the Order of the Crown
 Mr. Marcel Junius

From Her Majesty The Queen of Denmark

Order of the Dannebrog
 Mr. Jonas Lennart Albeck

From the President of Finland

Order of the White Rose, First Class
 Mr. Tenho Mikko Rautiainen

From the President of the French Republic

National Order of the Legion of Honour

Knight of the National Order of the Legion of Honour
 Mr. Okill Stuart

Order of Arts and Letters

Officer of the Order of Arts and Letters
 Mr. Marcel Fournier
 Mr. Hilliard Todd Goldfarb
 Mrs. Claire Martin
 Mr. John Porter

Knight of the Order of Arts and Letters
 Mr. Ronald Burnett
 Mrs. Marie Chouinard
 Mr. Paul-André Fortier
 Mr. George Laverock
 Mrs. Alice Munro
 Mrs. Line Ouellet
 Mr. William Thorsell

National Defence Medal

National Defence Medal, Gold Echelon with Clasp “Infantry”
 Commander Kewin Crowell
 Lieutenant-Colonel Jacques Pellan

From the President of Hungary

Knight's Cross of the Order of Merit of the Republic of Hungary (Civil Division)
 Professor Laszlo Kiss

From the President of Italy

Grand Officer of the Order of the Star of Solidarity
 Mr. Steven Muzzo

Knight of the Order of Merit
 Mr. Paolo Venerino Tamburello
 Mr. Elio Coppola
 Ms. Maddalena Palumbo Iannitti

Grand Officer of the Order of Merit
 Mr. Wilfrid Wilkinson

From His Majesty The Emperor of Japan

Order of the Rising Sun, Gold and Silver Rays
 Ms. Shizuko Kadoguchi
 Mr. Robert Koji Nimi
 Mr. Jonathan Takeo Yokoyama

From the Secretary General of the North Atlantic Treaty Organisation

NATO's Meritorious Service Medal
 Lieutenant-Colonel Peter Hauenstein
 Lieutenant-Colonel Jason Elliott King
 Corporal Eric Lund
 Lieutenant-General W. Angus Watt

From the President of Latvia

Cross of Recognition 
 Mr. Christophe Alexandre

From the President of Poland

Order of Merit

Commander's Cross of the Order of Merit
 Mr. David Preston
 Lieutenant-General Andrew Brooke Leslie

Officer's Cross of the Order of Merit
 Mr. Don Rosenbloom
 Mr. Jerzy Barycki
 Mr. Jerzy Bibik
 Mr. Szydlowski Krzysztof Lubicz
 Mrs. Ewa Poninska-Konopacka
 Mr. Adam Kreutzer
 Mrs. Zofia Stohandel
 Mr. Boleslaw Fujarczuk
 Mr. John Szumlas
 Mrs. Bozena Khan

Knight's Cross of the Order of Merit
 Mrs. Graźyna Urszula Farmus
 Mrs. Anne McDougall
 Mr. Guillaume Siemienski (posthumously)
 Mrs. Teresa Bobrowska
 Mr. Jacek Niemirski
 Mrs. Malgorzta De-Riedel Burczycka
 Dr. Janina Stencel
 Mrs. Malgorzata Niemirska

Gold Cross of the Order of Merit
 Mr. Marek Przykorski

Order of Polonia Restituta

Commander's Cross of the Order of Polonia Restituta
 Mr. Aleksander Siwy

Officer's Cross of the Order of Polonia Restituta
 Mr. Mieczyslaw Lutczyk
 Mr. Marceli Ostrowski
 Mrs. Nelli Franciszka Turzanska-Szymborska
 Mr. Zbigniew Gondek

Knight's Cross of the Order of Polonia Restituta
 Mr. Henryk Lekusz
 Mr. Wladyslaw Lizon
 Mr. Ted (Tadeusz) Opitz
 Mr. Boleslaw Rutkowski
 Mr. Stanislaw Wozniak

Gold Cross of Merit
 Mrs. Sophia (Zofia) De Witt
 Mr. Lionel Jose Goffart
 Mrs. Mary Nieć
 Mrs. Zofia Sliwinska
 Sister Teresa Bosowska
 Mr. Ireneusz Kotecki

Silver Cross of Merit
 Mr. Marian Jaworski
 Mrs. Teresa Maria Klimuszko
 Mr. Tad Lojko
 Mrs. Wieslawa Potocka
 Mrs. Janina Gojska 
 Mrs. Beata Malgorzata Grotkowska

Bronze Cross of Merit
 Mr. Henry Patterson
 Mr. Roman Wodejko
 Mr. Tomasz Wroblewski
 Mr. Jerzy Ziolkowski

(Erratum)
 The notice published on page 1668 of the June 26, 2010, issue of the Canada Gazette, Part I, is hereby amended as follows:

Officer's Cross of the Order of Polonia Restituta
 Mr. Szydlowski Krzysztof Lubicz
 Mrs. Ewa Poninska-Konopacka
 Mr. Adam Kreutzer
 Mrs. Zofia Stohandel

Knights Cross of the Order of Merit
 Mr. Ted (Tadeusz) Opitz
 Mr. Boleslaw Rutkowski

Gold Cross of the Order of Merit
 Mr. Jerzy Bibik

From the President of Portugal

Commander's Order of Merit
 Mr. Charles De Sousa

From the President of the United States of America

Legion of Merit

Officer of the Legion of Merit
 Major-General Peter J. Devlin
 Lieutenant-General J. O. Michel Maisonneuve

Bronze Star Medal
 Major Marie M. Ryan-Roberts

Meritorious Service Medal
 Chief Warrant Officer Jefferson P. Barry
 Major Barry A. Costiff
 Captain Andrew S. Dalziel
 Lieutenant-Colonel Normand Dionne
 Lieutenant-Colonel Rejean Duchesneau
 Lieutenant-Colonel John L. Frappier
 Commander Darren C. Hawco
 Colonel Ian Hope
 Major Douglas O’Neill
 Major Robert J. Paxton
 Colonel Barry Marshall Southern

Air Medal — first Oak Leaf Cluster
 Captain Pierre A. Grignon

Air Medal
 Captain Pierre A. Grignon
 Captain Steve G. Lamarche

References 

Monarchy in Canada